A.G. Barr plc, commonly known as Barr's, is a soft drink manufacturer based in Cumbernauld, Scotland. It is widely known for manufacturing the drink Irn-Bru. It is listed on the London Stock Exchange and is a constituent of the FTSE 250 Index.

History

The company was founded in 1875 by Robert Barr in Falkirk. In 1887, his son, Robert Fulton Barr, set up a division of the original company in Glasgow, which had a much larger population. In 1892 the Glasgow branch passed to Andrew Greig Barr (where the name A.G. Barr comes from), a brother of the branch's founder. In 1899, they soft launched Irn Bru, eventually launching it in 1901.  The Falkirk and Glasgow divisions merged in 1959, and the company was listed on the London Stock Exchange in 1965.

In 1972, A.G. Barr acquired the Tizer brand. In 2001 the company acquired Findlays Mineral Water which is sourced in the Lammermuir Hills. In 2002, Roger White joined A.G. Barr as managing director, and in 2004 became the first chief executive from outside the Barr family.

The Company acquired Forfar-based Strathmore Mineral Water in May 2006. The Irn-Bru 32 energy drink variant was launched in 2006. In 2008 the company purchased the Taut sports drink range and exotic fruit drink company Rubicon.

In November 2012, the company agreed to merge with Britvic, which produces drinks like J2O, Tango and Robinsons, as well as holding the authority to produce Pepsi for the UK market, to create one of Europe's largest soft drinks companies. The merger was abandoned in July 2013.

In December 2022, the company acquired Boost Drinks for £20 million from founders Simon and Alison Gray.

Operations
A.G. Barr produces a variety of soft drinks from production sites at Cumbernauld, Forfar and Milton Keynes. Irn-Bru was launched in 1901.

Brands

Boost Drinks energy and sports drink acquired in December 2022
Irn-Bru Scotland's most popular soft drink
Tizer bought in 1972
Barr Flavours including Cola, Lemonade, Limeade and Cherryade
Bundaberg (manufactured under license for the UK and Ireland markets)
D'N'B dandelion and burdock
KA
OMJ!
Rubicon Drinks
San Benedetto soft drinks (manufactured under license for the UK market)
Simply Fruity
Snapple (manufactured under license for the UK and Ireland markets)
Strathmore Scottish spring water
Sun Exotic
Xyber energy drinks

References

External links
Official site

1875 establishments in Scotland
British companies established in 1875
Companies based in North Lanarkshire
Companies listed on the London Stock Exchange
Drink companies of Scotland
Family-owned companies of Scotland
Food and drink companies established in 1875
Scottish brands
Soft drinks manufacturers